This article depicts the NCAA Football Championship Subdivision Alignment History—specifically, all schools that have competed in the lower tier of NCAA Division I college football since Division I football was split into two subdivisions in 1978. This includes schools competing in:
 Division I-AA from 1978 through 2005
 Division I FCS since 2006

Teams in bold italics are now in the Football Bowl Subdivision (FBS); those in plain italics either play football in lower divisions or not at all. Teams followed by an asterisk (*) dropped football.

Dates reflect when a team began play in I-AA/FCS, not when it became eligible for postseason play.

As of the upcoming 2023 season, three schools are transitioning from FCS to FBS. The most recent school to complete such a transition is James Madison, which completed an expedited one-year transition in 2022 as a new member of the Sun Belt Conference. The three schools transitioning are Jacksonville State, Kennesaw State, and Sam Houston; Jacksonville State and Sam Houston began FBS transitions in 2022 in advance of their 2023 move to Conference USA, and Kennesaw State begins its transition in 2023, playing as an FCS team, and will join C-USA in 2024. For that, Kennesaw State was ineligible for the 2022 FCS playoffs.

Idaho downgraded its football team from FBS to FCS, and rejoined its all-sports home of the Big Sky Conference as a football member in July 2018. Also in July 2018, North Alabama started a transition from NCAA Division II, joining the ASUN Conference for non-football sports at that time, with the football team playing as an FCS independent in 2018 before joining the Big South Conference in 2019.

Two teams joined the FCS ranks in 2020—Dixie State, now known as Utah Tech, and Tarleton. Both schools started transitions to Division I, with the football teams becoming FCS independents while all other sports joined the non-football Western Athletic Conference. The WAC reinstated football at the FCS level for the fall 2021 season, coinciding with the arrival of four schools from the Southland Conference. UTRGV, currently a full WAC member without football, initially announced it will start an FCS football program no later than 2024, but delayed that move to 2025.

The next school to join FCS was St. Thomas, which joined the non-football Summit League and the Pioneer Football League in 2021 as part of an unprecedented transition directly from Division III to Division I. A year later, two other schools joined FCS as part of transitions from Division II, namely Lindenwood and Texas A&M–Commerce. Augustana University, a South Dakota D-II school not to be confused with the D-III Augustana College in Illinois, announced plans to transition to D-I, but was turned down by the Summit League.

School names reflect those in current use, not necessarily those used by a school when it competed in I-AA/FCS. Specifically, these schools were known by different names throughout their entire tenures in Division I-AA/FCS:
 Louisiana-Monroe — Northeast Louisiana
 Troy — Troy State
 UConn — Connecticut
 In the case of UConn, "Connecticut" was the official athletic name, but "UConn" was in wide use alongside "Connecticut" before becoming the university's sole athletic brand in 2013.
 West Texas A&M — West Texas State
 Winston-Salem State — Winston-Salem

Alignments are current for the 2023 season.

A
 Abilene Christian 2013–present
Alabama A&M 1999–present
Akron 1980–1986
Alabama State 1982–present
Albany 1999–present
Alcorn State 1978–present
Appalachian State 1982–2013
Arkansas-Pine Bluff 1998–present
Arkansas State 1982–1991
Augustana TBD
Austin Peay 1978–present

B
Ball State 1982
Bethune-Cookman 1980–present
Brown 1982–present
Bucknell 1978–present
Butler 1993–present
Boise State 1978–1998
Boston University* 1978–1997
Bowling Green 1982
Bryant 2008–present
Buffalo 1993–1998

C
UC Davis 2007–present
Cal Poly 1994–present
Cal State Northridge* 1993–2001
Campbell 2008–present
Canisius* 1993–2002
Central Arkansas 2006–present
Central Connecticut State 1993–present
UCF 1990–1995
Charleston Southern 1993–present
Charlotte 2013–2014
Chattanooga 1982–present
The Citadel 1982–present
Coastal Carolina 2003–2016
Colgate 1982–present
Columbia 1982–present
Cornell 1982–present

D
Dartmouth 1982–present
Davidson 1978-1990, 1993–present
Dayton 1993–present
Delaware 1980–present
Delaware State 1978, 1980–present
Drake 1981–1985, 1993–present
Duquesne 1993–present

E
Eastern Illinois 1981–present
Eastern Kentucky 1978–present
Eastern Michigan 1982
Eastern Washington 1984–present
East Tennessee State 1982–2003, 2015–present
Elon 1999–present
Evansville* 1993–1997

F
Fairfield* 1997–2002
FIU 2003–2005
Florida A&M 1979–present
Florida Atlantic 2001–2004
Fordham 1989–present
Furman 1982–present

G
Gardner–Webb 2002–present
Georgetown 1993–present
Georgia Southern 1984–2013
Georgia State 2010–2012
Grambling 1978–present

H
Hampton 1997–present
Harvard 1982–present
Hofstra* 1993–2009
Holy Cross 1982–present
 Houston Christian 2013–present
Howard 1978, 1980–present

I
 Idaho 1978–1996, 2018–present
 Idaho State 1978–present
 Illinois State 1982–present
 Incarnate Word 2013–present
 Indiana State 1982–present
 Iona* 1993–2008

J
Jackson State 1978–present
Jacksonville* 1998–2019
Jacksonville State 1997–2022
James Madison 1980–2021

K
 Kennesaw State 2015–2023
 Kent State 1982

L
 Lamar 1982–1989, 2010–present
 La Salle 1997–present
 Lafayette 1978–present
 Lehigh 1978–present
 Liberty 1989–2017
 Lindenwood 2022–present
 LIU 2019–present
 Louisiana–Monroe 1982–1993
 Louisiana Tech 1982–1988

M
Maine 1978–present
Marist 1993–present
Marshall 1982–1996
Massachusetts 1978–2011
McNeese 1982–present
Merrimack 2019–present
Middle Tennessee 1978–1998
Mississippi Valley State 1980–present
Missouri State 1982–present
Monmouth 1994–present
Montana 1978–present
Montana State 1978–present
Morris Brown* 2001–2002
Morehead State 1978–present
Morgan State 1986–present
Murray State 1978–present

N
Nevada 1978–1991
New Hampshire 1978–present
Nicholls 1980–present
Norfolk State 1997–present
North Alabama 2018–present
North Carolina A&T 1978–present
North Dakota 2008–present
North Dakota State 2004–present
North Texas 1982–1994
Northeastern* 1978–2009
Northern Arizona 1978–present
Northern Colorado 2007–present
Northern Illinois 1982
Northern Iowa 1981–present
Northwestern State 1978–present

O
Ohio 1982
Old Dominion 2009–2013

P
Pennsylvania 1982–present
Portland State 1978–1980, 1998–present
Prairie View 1978–present
Presbyterian 2007–present
Princeton 1982–present

R
Rhode Island 1978–present
Richmond 1982–present
Robert Morris 1998–present

S
Sacramento State 1993–present
Sacred Heart 1999–present
Saint Francis (PA) 1993–present
St. John's (NY)* 1993–2002
Saint Mary's (CA)* 1993–2003
Saint Peter's* 1993–2006
St. Thomas 2021–present
Sam Houston 1986–2022
Samford 1989–present
San Diego 1993–present
Savannah State 2002–2018
Siena* 1993–2003
South Alabama 2011
South Carolina State 1978, 1980–present
South Dakota 2008–present
South Dakota State 2004–present
South Florida 1997–2000
Southeast Missouri State 1990–present
Southeastern Louisiana 1980–1985; 2003–present
Southern U. 1978–present
Southern Illinois 1982–present
Southern Utah 1993–present
Stephen F. Austin 1986–present
Stonehill 2022–present
Stony Brook 1999–present

T
 Tarleton 2020–present
Tennessee State 1981–present
Tennessee Tech 1978–present
Texas A&M–Commerce 2022–present
Texas-Arlington* 1982–1985
Texas Southern 1978–present
Texas State 1984–2011
Towson 1987–present
Troy 1993–2001

U
UAB 1993–1995
UConn 1978–2001
 UT Martin 1992–present
 Utah Tech 2020–present
UTSA 2011

V
Valparaiso 1993–present
Villanova 1987–present
VMI 1982–present

W
Wagner 1993–present
Weber State 1978–present
West Texas A&M 1982–1985
Western Carolina 1982–present
Western Illinois 1981–present
Western Kentucky 1978–2007
William & Mary 1982–present
Winston-Salem 2006–2009
Wofford 1995–present

Y
Yale 1982–present
Youngstown State 1981–present

See also
NCAA Division I men's basketball alignment history
NCAA Division I Football Bowl Subdivision alignment history

College football-related lists
Alignment
NCAA Division I lists